This is a list of Superfund sites in Louisiana designated under the Comprehensive Environmental Response, Compensation, and Liability Act (CERCLA) environmental law.  The CERCLA federal law of 1980 authorized the United States Environmental Protection Agency (EPA) to create a list of polluted locations requiring a long-term response to clean up hazardous material contaminations.   These locations are known as Superfund sites, and are placed on the National Priorities List (NPL).  

The NPL guides the EPA in "determining which sites warrant further investigation" for environmental remediation.  As of May 3, 2010, there were nine Superfund sites on the National Priorities List in Louisiana.  Three more sites have been proposed for entry on the list and eleven others have been cleaned up and removed from it.

Superfund sites

See also
List of Superfund sites in the United States
List of environmental issues
List of waste types
TOXMAP

References

Louisiana

Superfund